Abda and Sabas were two martyrs mentioned in the Menologium der Orthodox-Katholischen Kirche des Morgenlandes by Probst Maltzew. Their feast day is 8 July.

References

Sources
Holweck, F. G. A Biographical Dictionary of the Saints. St. Louis, MO: B. Herder Book Co., 1924.

Year of birth missing
Year of death missing
Christian martyrs
Christian saints in unknown century
Saints duos